The Center for Libertarian Studies (CLS) was a libertarian and anarcho-capitalist oriented educational organization founded in 1976 by Murray Rothbard and Burton Blumert, which grew out of the Libertarian Scholars Conferences. That year, the conference was sponsored by industrialist and libertarian Charles Koch. It published the Journal of Libertarian Studies from 1977 to 2000 (now published by the Ludwig von Mises Institute), a newsletter (In Pursuit of Liberty), several monographs, and sponsors conferences, seminars, and symposia.

Publications
 Justin Raimondo, Reclaiming the American Right (1993).
 Joseph Sobran, How I Got Fired by Bill Buckley (1994).
 Justin Raimondo, Clinton's Hate Campaign Against the Right: the Oklahoma City Bombing and the Campaign to Crush Dissent (1995)
 Murray Rothbard, Wall Street, Banks, and American Foreign Policy (1995).
 The Rothbard-Rockwell Report (1990–1999)
 Rockwell, Jr, Llewellyn H., editor, The Irrepressible Rothbard: The Rothbard-Rockwell Report, Essays of Murray N. Rothbard (2000)

Occasional Papers Series
 Methodology of the Austrian School, Lawrence White
 The Production of Security, Gustave de Molinari
 Toward a Reconstruction of Utility and Welfare Economics, Murray Rothbard (1977)
 The Political Economy of Liberal Corporativism, essays by Joseph Stromberg, Roy A. Childs, and Roger Alexander
 Theory of Classical Liberal "Industrielisme", Augustin Thierry
 Why the Futile Crusade?, Leonard Liggio
 The Clash of Group Interests and Other Essays, Ludwig von Mises (1978)
 The Austrian Theory of the Trade Cycle and other essays by Ludwig von Mises, Gottfried Haberler, Murray Rothbard, and Friedrich A. Hayek, Richard Ebeling, ed. (1978)
 Austrian Economics: an Annotated Bibliography, Richard Ebeling
 Frank S. Meyer: The Fusionist as Libertarian Manqué, Murray Rothbard (1984)

References

External links
 Nozick and Rothbard at the WTC by Burton S. Blumert at lewrockwell.com
 Online archive of the Journal of Libertarian Studies

Anarcho-capitalist organizations
Paleolibertarianism
Political and economic think tanks in the United States
Libertarian think tanks
Libertarian organizations based in the United States
Mises Institute